The Wigan Warriors are an English professional rugby league club founded in 1872. In 1998, the club created a hall of fame to honour former players and coaches for their contribution to the club. The inaugural members were Billy Boston and Shaun Edwards.

As of 2017, six of the Hall of Fame inductees are also included in the British Rugby League Hall of Fame (Boston, Edwards, Eric Ashton, Jim Sullivan, Ellery Hanley and Martin Offiah).

Members

Notes

References

External links
Hall of Fame

Hall
Rugby league museums and halls of fame
Halls of fame in England
1998 establishments in England
1998 in British sport